Esther Lavelle Snyder (née Johnson) (January 7, 1920 – August 4, 2006) was an American businesswoman. She co-founded In-N-Out Burger, with her husband Harry Snyder, in 1948.

Early life
Snyder was born and raised in Sorento, Illinois, as one of eight children (seven daughters, one son). She attended Greenville College and graduated from Seattle Pacific University with a bachelor's degree in zoology.

Marriage and family
She met Harry Snyder in 1947, while working at a restaurant in Seattle; the two were married the following year and moved to Baldwin Park, California.

Esther and Harry Snyder had two sons: Harry Guy (more commonly referred to as simply "Guy"; born 1951) and Richard Snyder (born 1952) and one granddaughter from their first son Guy: Lynsi (born 1982). Esther outlived her husband, who died in 1976 and both of their sons, one of whom died in a plane crash and the other of a drug overdose.

Death
Snyder died on August 4, 2006, in Baldwin Park, California, aged 86, from undisclosed causes. Her only grandchild, Lynsi Snyder-Ellingson, is now the heiress to the In-N-Out Burger company.

Esther Snyder Community Center
Since  In-N-Out Burger  was started in the city of Baldwin Park, the city named its community center after Esther Snyder.

References

Further reading 

1920 births
2006 deaths
American food company founders
American Methodists
Businesspeople from Los Angeles
Fast-food chain founders
Greenville College people
People from Baldwin Park, California
People from Bond County, Illinois
Seattle Pacific University alumni
American women company founders
American company founders
Snyder family